The 1885 St. Louis Maroons season was the team's first season in the National League after winning the Union Association championship in 1884. This season was not nearly as successful, as the Maroons finished with a 36–72 record, worst in the eight-team league.

Regular season

Season standings

Record vs. opponents

Opening Day lineup

Roster

Player stats

Batting

Starters by position 
Note: Pos = Position; G = Games played; AB = At bats; H = Hits; Avg. = Batting average; HR = Home runs; RBI = Runs batted in

Other batters 
Note: G = Games played; AB = At bats; H = Hits; Avg. = Batting average; HR = Home runs; RBI = Runs batted in

Pitching

Starting pitchers 
Note: G = Games pitched; IP = Innings pitched; W = Wins; L = Losses; ERA = Earned run average; SO = Strikeouts

Relief pitchers 
Note: G = Games pitched; W = Wins; L = Losses; SV = Saves; ERA = Earned run average; SO = Strikeouts

References 
 1885 St. Louis Maroons team page at Baseball Reference

St. Louis Maroons seasons
St. Louis Maroons season
St Louis